Trevor Womble (born 7 June 1951 in South Shields) is an English former footballer who played in the Football League for Rotherham United, Crewe Alexandra and Halifax Town.

He began his footballing career as an apprentice with Rotherham United and was only 17 years old when he made his full debut in a 3–1 defeat to Stockport County in 1968. He was right footed and played in a midfield role. He was the second highest scorer in the Rotherham United team that won promotion from Division Four in 1974–75. He also spent spells on loan at Crewe Alexandra and Halifax Town, and retired in 1978 through injury.

References

1951 births
Footballers from South Shields
English footballers
Living people
Rotherham United F.C. players
Crewe Alexandra F.C. players
Halifax Town A.F.C. players
English Football League players
Association football midfielders